The Ghana Badminton Federation is the national organization for Badminton and is responsible for governing the sport in Ghana. It aims to govern, encourage and develop the sport throughout Ghana. Established as Ghana Badminton Association in 1962, the national association is based in Accra and has departments for Development, Elite, Independent, Competitive, Events, Membership, Development, and Coaching. It closely liaises with the regional associations across the 16 regions of Ghana in collaboration with our 82 Community clubs and 354 schools, colleges, and universities to provide support to district schools, clubs, and league structures. The national association works with corporate sponsors to host events locally and internationally and develop podium professional players, technical officials, and coaches. 

The National Federation was a founding member of the Badminton Confederation of Africa, and an affiliate  member of the Badminton World Federation (BWF). 
In tandem with growing the sport, it provides Basic, Senior High and Tertiary School programmes to seniors; Veterans social badminton delivered from School, Community and regional clubs;  national class coaching development and the delivery of  major events.

Presidents

Since its inception in 1962, the Ghana Badminton Association  had seven presidents.

 Lt. Col Kumi
 Mr. Akainyah, Esq
 Mr. F.M. Dickson
 Mr. Charles K. Darko 
 Mr. Paul Kodjokuma
 Mr. Nestor Percy Galley 
 Yeboah Evans, CGMA

References

Ghana
Badminton in Ghana
Sports governing bodies in Ghana
1972 establishments in Ghana